Adam G. Vaughan (born July 3, 1961) is a Canadian politician who served as a Member of Parliament (MP) from 2014 until 2021. Vaughan represented the Toronto area riding of Spadina—Fort York as a member of the Liberal Party. He previously sat on Toronto City Council, representing Ward 20 Trinity—Spadina from 2006 until he resigned in 2014 to run in a federal by-election for Trinity—Spadina.

During his time as an MP, Vaughan served as the parliamentary secretary to prime minister on intergovernmental affairs from 2015 to 2017, and to the minister of families, children and social development on housing and urban affairs from 2017 to 2021. Prior to his political career, he was a radio and television journalist. In August 2021, Vaughan announced that he would not seek re-election to Parliament.

Background
Vaughan is married to Nicole Anatol and has a son and a daughter from previous relationships. He was previously married to journalist Suhana Meharchand. His father, Colin Vaughan, was a noted architect, television journalist and former city councillor, who was CityTV's political reporter until his death in 2000.

Media career (1982 – 2006) 
Adam Vaughan worked at Ryerson Polytechnical Institute's radio station CKLN from 1982 to 1987, and was manager of the station from 1985 to 1987. He joined CITY-TV in 1987 as a producer of CityWide. He left in 1989 to join the board of the World Association of Community Radio Broadcasters.

In 1990, he joined Metro Morning on CBL as a segment producer. He subsequently joined CBLT in 1994, covering City Hall as a municipal reporter, producer, and director. Vaughan has covered Toronto Police Service, Toronto City Hall, Queen's Park and Parliament Hill in his career. He returned to the Citytv team in 2000.

Vaughan has written for Toronto Life magazine and the Toronto Star.  Before becoming a journalist, Adam Vaughan was a cartoonist for Books in Canada, Quill and Quire, Canadian Forum and several other publications.

After Marilyn Lastman, the wife of the then mayor of Toronto Mel Lastman, was caught shoplifting from an Eaton's store in Toronto, the mayor threatened to kill Vaughan if he reported on his family.

Political career (2006 – 2021)

Municipal politics (2006 – 2014) 
Vaughan ran in Trinity—Spadina - Ward 20 in the 2006 municipal election. The seat had been vacated by Olivia Chow who left the city for federal politics. He won the seat defeating Helen Kennedy, Chow's executive assistant, by 2,300 votes.

After the 2010 mayoral election, Vaughan was an outspoken critic of then-Toronto Mayor Rob Ford.

As a member of City Council Vaughan sat on the Toronto Police Services Board,  the Planning and Growth Management Committee, the Toronto Arts Council, Artscape Board, the Board of Trustees for the Art Gallery of Ontario, and the Harbourfront Centre Board. Additionally he sat on the city's Heritage Board, and the city's Preservation Board.

Federal politics (2014 – 2021) 
In 2014, he ran as the Liberal candidate in a federal by-election to succeed New Democratic Party MP Olivia Chow, who had resigned to run for Mayor of Toronto. At the time. the Liberals had their fewest MPs in history.  Vaughan resigned his city council seat on May 13, 2014, several days after the Trinity—Spadina by-election was called. He defeated NDP candidate Joe Cressy by 6,745 votes, a nearly 2-to-1 margin.

Vaughan was quickly promoted to the Liberal front bench as critic for urban affairs and housing.

In the October 2015 federal election, Vaughan ran in Spadina—Fort York, essentially the southern portion of his old riding.  His main opponent was Chow, the person who he had replaced twice, first on Toronto City Council and then later as MP.  Once the election was called, Vaughan initially trailed Chow in public opinion polls. However, on election day, in part due to a massive surge of Liberal support in Toronto, he defeated Chow convincingly, taking 54.5% of the vote to Chow's 27.4%.

On December 2, 2015, he was appointed the parliamentary secretary to the prime minister for intergovernmental affairs.

In August, 2021, Vaughan announced he would not be seeking re-election in the 2021 Canadian federal election. He was succeeded by Kevin Vuong, who was nominated as a Liberal, but saw party support for him dropped after the revelation of sexual assault charges against him in 2019.

Electoral record

Federal elections

Municipal elections

References

External links

1961 births
Canadian people of Australian descent
Canadian television reporters and correspondents
Liberal Party of Canada MPs
Living people
Members of the House of Commons of Canada from Ontario
Toronto Metropolitan University alumni
People from Old Toronto
Toronto city councillors
Writers from Toronto
21st-century Canadian politicians